The 3rd constituency of the Seine-Maritime (French: Troisième circonscription de la Seine-Maritime) is a French legislative constituency in the Seine-Maritime département. Like the other 576 French constituencies, it elects one MP using the two-round system, with a run-off if no candidate receives over 50% of the vote in the first round.

Description
The 3rd Constituency of the Seine-Maritime covers the south of Rouen proper plus the city's southern suburbs. The large former railway town of Sotteville-lès-Rouen on the south bank of the Seine makes up a significant part of this seat. Boundary changes prior to the 2012 elections added Rouen's VI canton to the seat.

Reflecting its industrial heritage the seat has oscillated between the centre left PS and the Communist Party.

Assembly Members

Election results

2022

 
 
 
 
 
 
 
 
|-
| colspan="8" bgcolor="#E9E9E9"|
|-
 
 

 
 
 
 
 

* PS dissident

2017

2012

 
 
 
 
 
 
 
|-
| colspan="8" bgcolor="#E9E9E9"|
|-
 
 

 
 
 
 

* Withdrew before the 2nd round

2007

 
 
 
 
 
 
 
|-
| colspan="8" bgcolor="#E9E9E9"|
|-

2002

 
 
 
 
 
 
|-
| colspan="8" bgcolor="#E9E9E9"|
|-

1997

 
 
 
 
 
 
 
|-
| colspan="8" bgcolor="#E9E9E9"|
|-
 
 

 
 
 
 

* Withdrew before the 2nd round

References

3